Ryusuke Minami (南 竜介, born July 9, 1981 in Nishinomiya) is a Japanese former professional baseball outfielder in Japan's Nippon Professional Baseball. He played for the Yokohama BayStars in 2004 and 2005 and the Chiba Lotte Marines from 2006 to 2012. He attended Hōtoku Gakuen High School.

References

External links

NPB

1981 births
Living people
People from Nishinomiya
Japanese baseball players
Yokohama BayStars players
Chiba Lotte Marines players
Baseball people from Hyōgo Prefecture